Old Leake is a village and civil parish in Lincolnshire, England. The population of the civil parish at the 2011 census was 2,022.

Areas included in the parish are The Gride to the north-west, Leake Commonside and Lade Bank to the north, and Leake Hurns End to the south-east.

Geography

Old Leake is one of eighteen parishes which, together with Boston, form the Borough of Boston in the county of Lincolnshire, England. The local government has been arranged in this way since the reorganisation of 1 April 1974, which resulted from the Local Government Act 1972. This parish forms part of the Old Leake and Wrangle electoral ward.

Hitherto, the parish had formed part of Boston Rural District, in the Parts of Holland. Holland was one of the three divisions (formally known as parts) of the traditional county of Lincolnshire. Since the Local Government Act of 1888, Holland had been in most respects, a county in itself.

Community
The parish church is a Grade I listed building dedicated to St Mary, and dating from the 12th century, with the chancel being restored in 1875 by Temple Moore. There is a 15th-century alms box The lychgate is Grade II listed and may have been built by Temple Moore. 

Howsams Mill, built in 1859, is a Grade II listed building at Leake Commonside.

A water tower of Swedish design was erected in 1966.

The village public houses are the White Hart on Church Road and the Bricklayer's Arms on Wainfleet Road (A52). There is a National Health Service doctors' surgery, Old Leake Medical Centre, which takes patients from Old Leake and the surrounding villages, including Eastville, Wrangle, Friskney, Leverton, Butterwick, Freiston, Sibsey and Fishtoft.

Giles Academy, a secondary school with sixth form, is on Church End. Old Leake Primary School is on Old Main Road.

Lade Bank Pumping Station

Lade Bank lock was built on the Hobhole Drain in 1805 by John Rennie and 1867 the Lade Bank pumping station was built of red and yellow brick. Originally a lock of four cutwaters and two abutments with grooves and fixings for lock gates. In 1867 an engine house and pumping station with tall chimney were built above. The engine house contained six boilers to raise the steam to operate the two pumps. It was replaced by a modern station of 1936 also partly built on the original lock bases.

Population

References

External links

 Primary and Nursery school
 Youth FC
 Parish council
Giles Academy. Retrieved 22 April 2012

Borough of Boston
Civil parishes in Lincolnshire
Villages in Lincolnshire